Tillandsia orogenes is a species of flowering plant in the genus Tillandsia. This species is native to Chiapas, Guatemala, Nicaragua and Honduras.

References

orogenes
Flora of Chiapas
Flora of Central America
Plants described in 1953